Jayshree V. Ullal (born March 27, 1961) is an Indian-American billionaire businesswoman, president and CEO of Arista Networks, a cloud networking company responsible for the deployment of 10/25/40/50/100 Gigabit Ethernet networking in the data center.

Early life 
Ullal was born in London, and raised in New Delhi, India, through her school years. She eventually attended San Francisco State University where she graduated with a B.S. in engineering (electrical). She went on to Santa Clara University where she received a master's degree in engineering management.

Career 
Ullal began her career with engineering and strategy positions at Advanced Micro Devices (AMD) and Fairchild Semiconductor. She was director of internetworking products at Ungermann-Bass for four years before joining Crescendo Communications. At Crescendo, Ullal became vice president of marketing, working with 100-Mbit/s over copper, the first CDDI products and first generation Ethernet switching.

Cisco 
In September 1993, Cisco Systems acquired Crescendo Communications, marking Cisco's first acquisition and foray into the switching market. Ullal joined Cisco and began work on the Cisco Catalyst switching business, which grew from its beginning, in 1993, to a $5 billion business in 2000. As vice president and general manager of LAN switching in the Enterprise group, Ullal was responsible for unified communications, IP telephony, content networking and policy networking. She oversaw some 20 mergers and acquisitions for Cisco in the enterprise sector.

Ullal was eventually named Senior Vice President of Data Center & Switching, reporting directly to company CEO John Chambers. Responsibilities included the direction of the modular Nexus and Catalyst Data Center Switching and Application/Virtualization services which saw about $15 billion of direct and indirect revenue. Ullal's career at Cisco spanned more than 15 years.

Arista 
In October 2008, co-founders Andy Bechtolsheim & David Cheriton named Ullal CEO & President of Arista Networks, a cloud networking company located in Santa Clara, CA.

Ullal was named by Forbes magazine as "one of the top five most influential people in the networking industry today" for her work at Arista Networks.

In June 2014, Ullal led Arista Networks to an IPO on the New York Stock Exchange under the symbol ANET.

Jayshree was named one of Barron’s “World’s Best CEOs” in 2018  and one of Fortune’s “Top 20 Business persons” in 2019.

Board of Directors 
 May 2008 - 2010 ; Zscaler
 Oct 2008–Present ; Arista Networks
 June 2020 – Present ; Snowflake Inc.

Awards and honors 
 One of the 50 Most Powerful People in the 2005 Network World
 A Top Ten Executive in VMWorld 2011
 A Women of Influence award for Security CSOs in 2008
 One of the Top Women in Storage in 2007
 Nominated as one of the 20 powerful Women to Watch in 2001 by Newsweek
 2001 Innovator and Influencer Award by Information Week
 First woman to be awarded the Entrepreneurial and Leadership award, sponsored by Silicon India, in 1999
 One of the seven prominent Indian-origin women in the IT industry, according to The Economic Times
 Recipient of the 2013 Santa Clara University School of Engineering Distinguished Engineering Alumni Award
 Ranked #2 in Top 25 Disrupters of 2014 list by CRN
 Ranked #3 in Top 25 Disrupters of 2015 list by CRN
 Ranked #9 in the 30 Most Impressive Female Engineers Alive Today list by Best Computer Science Degrees
 EY US Entrepreneur Of The Year Award Winner 2015
 World's Best CEOs: Growth Leaders 2018
 1 on Masala's MOST INFLUENTIAL Asian Women in America list
 Named to Barron's “World's Best CEOs” list in 2018 and 2019.
 18 on Fortune's Businessperson of the Year for 2019 list.
 Honoured with 8th annual Forbes’ America’s Richest Self-Made Women in 2022.
 Member of Silicon Valley Business Journal's first Power 100 list for 2023.
 2023 ET Global Indian award winner

Personal life 
She is married to Vijay Ullal. They have two daughters and live in Saratoga, California. Vijay Ullal, now a venture capitalist and investor, was president and chief operating officer of Fairchild Semiconductor from September 2012, until November 2014. She is also the sister of the late Saratoga City Councilwoman Susie Nagpal, who has a surviving son and daughter. Forbes estimates that Jayshree owns about 5% of Arista's stock, some of which is earmarked for her two children, niece and nephew.

References 

1961 births
Living people
American technology chief executives
American women chief executives
American women computer scientists
American computer scientists
San Francisco State University alumni
Santa Clara University alumni
People from Saratoga, California
American billionaires
Female billionaires
21st-century American women
Indian emigrants to the United States
People from New Delhi
American people of Indian descent